Jonoob Ahvaz Football Club was an Iranian football club based in Ahvaz, Iran. The club was founded in 1973 and it was one of the most well-known clubs of Khuzestan in the early 1990s. Jonoob Ahvaz F.C. participated in the highest division of Iranian football league during the 1990s and was among the top clubs of the national league for 6 consecutive years.

Jonoob made it to the Hazfi Cup final match in the season 1993–94 but was defeated by Saipa F.C. in the final. In the following years they were given a slot from Iranian football federation to attend in 1994–95 Asian Cup Winners' Cup. Jonoob was eliminated in the quarter final stage in the tournament.

During the mid 1990s the club encountered financial problems and lack of financial resources made the club relegated to Iran Football's 2nd Division. Consequently in 1996, their right to participate in Iran Football's 2nd Division was taken over by Foolad Khuzestan F.C. and the club  was dissolved.

References

Football clubs in Iran
Association football clubs established in 1973
Sport in Ahvaz
1973 establishments in Iran
1996 disestablishments in Iran
Association football clubs disestablished in 1996